Mersin University is a public university, built in 1992 in Mersin Province, Turkey. It has about 39,000 students, 1,813 academic staff, and a number of foreign and guest academic staff.

The university has research and sports facilities, in Mersin town centre and in other towns.

In 2005 the Mersin Technology Development Zone (Technoscope) was set up, creating a partnership between the university's research and development departments and industry, with the aim of developing new technologies that could be directly translated into industrial production.

Departments 

Faculty of Engineering
Faculty of Economics and Managerial Sciences
Faculty of Arts and Science
Faculty of Fine Arts
Faculty of Water Resources
Faculty of Pharmacy
Faculty of Medicine
Faculty of Architecture
Faculty of Educational Sciences
Faculty of Tarsus Technical Education
Faculty of Communication

Notable alumni
Deniz Sağdıç, artist
Elçin Sangu, actress
Dirayet Taşdemir, politician
Nevin Yanıt, Turkish female sprinter

References

External links
Mersin University website
Website of Mersin University Students

Educational institutions established in 1992
Universities and colleges in Turkey
Buildings and structures in Mersin
State universities and colleges in Turkey
2013 Mediterranean Games venues
1992 establishments in Turkey
Mersin University
Water polo venues